Koka Records is a Ukrainian-Polish record label for traditional Ukrainian folk music and Ukrainian independent music. They have published albums by groups such as Kazma-Kazma, Cukor Bila Smerť, Kollezhskiy Asessor The Ukrainians, Drevo and Oseledets' as well as individuals like Svitlana Nianio, Ihor Tsymbrovsky and Mykhailo Hai. They are considered to be an important part of Ukraine's underground music history.

The label was founded by the Ukrainian Volodymyr Nakonetchny (Polish: Włodzimierz Nakonieczny) in 1989. As the state monopoly on music recording and release had already ended in Poland, Poland became a viable place to release underground recordings made in Soviet Ukraine. As the years went on and the Soviet Union ceased to exist, Koka's scope expanded to include traditional music, with special focus on the music around the Polish-Ukrainian border.

References 

Ukrainian record labels
Polish record labels
Independent record labels